Physalaemus moreirae is a species of frog in the family Leptodactylidae. It is endemic to the Serra do Mar in the São Paulo state, Brazil.

Description
Males measure  and females  in snout–vent length.

Habitat and conservation
Its natural habitats are primary forests where it occurs in leaf-litter or on stones near water, often in association with small temporary pools (even those formed in boot prints). However, breeding takes place in temporary streams; the eggs are laid in foam nests in wide pools in the streams. Habitat loss is a probable threat. Also chytridiomycosis could be a threat.

References

moreirae
Endemic fauna of Brazil
Amphibians of Brazil
Amphibians described in 1937
Taxa named by Alípio de Miranda-Ribeiro
Taxonomy articles created by Polbot